Hugh Alexander may refer to:

 Hugh E. Alexander (1884–1957), Scottish minister
 Hugh Quincy Alexander (1911–1989), Democratic U.S Representative from North Carolina
 Conel Hugh O'Donel Alexander (1909–1974), British chess player and cryptanalyst
 Hugh Alexander (baseball) (1917–2000), American baseball outfielder and scout